Tillandsia × jaguactalensis is a natural hybrid (T.  brachycaulos × T. streptophylla) of the genus Tillandsia. This plant is endemic to Mexico.

References

jaguactalensis
Flora of Mexico
Plant nothospecies